The 2020 Championship League (also known as the 2020 Matchroom.com Championship League) was a professional non-ranking snooker tournament that took place from 1 to 11 June 2020 at the Marshall Arena in Milton Keynes, England. The event featured 64 players from the World Snooker Tour featuring three rounds of round-robin groups of four. The initial group stage matches were played between 1 and 8 June, with the group winners' stage played on 9 and 10 June, before the finals stage on 11 June. It was the 14th edition of the Championship League. The event was one of the first live sporting events in the United Kingdom since the start of the coronavirus lockdown in March 2020.

Luca Brecel won the event after finishing top of the final group ahead of Ben Woollaston, Stuart Bingham and Ryan Day. The event was broadcast on ITV4 in the United Kingdom, Eurosport across Europe, Superstars Online, Youku and Zhibo.tv in China, Fox Sports in Australia and Sky in New Zealand. Elsewhere, the event was broadcast on Matchroom Sport.

Tournament format
The 2020 Championship League was held between 1 and 11 June 2020 at the Marshall Arena in Milton Keynes, England. The tournament took place without an audience whilst maintaining social distancing. Originally due to take place in Leicester, the event was moved to Milton Keynes because of the on-site facilities at the venue, meaning that the players and officials did not need to leave the location for the duration of their involvement once they had arrived. All players were tested for COVID-19 prior to taking part. The event was sponsored by Matchroom Sport and broadcast live domestically on ITV4. It was also broadcast by Eurosport across Europe, Superstars Online, Youku and Zhibo.tv in China, Fox Sports in Australia and Sky in New Zealand.

There were 64 snooker professionals who took part in the event. The competition began with 16 rounds of group matches with each group consisting of four players. Two groups were played to a finish every day from 1 to 8 June, using a two-table setup in the arena. The groups were contested using a round-robin format, with six matches played in each group. All matches were played as best-of-four frames, with three points awarded for a win and one point for a draw. Group positions were determined by points scored, frame difference and then head-to-head results between players who are tied. Places that were still tied were then determined by the highest  made in the group.

The 16 players that topped the group tables qualified for the group winners' stage, consisting of four groups of four players. Two of the four groups played to a finish on 9 June and the other two groups on 10 June, again using two tables. The four winners from the group winners' stage qualified for the tournament finals played on 11 June using a single table. The winner of this final group took the Championship League title and a place at the 2020 Champion of Champions.

Prize fund 
The breakdown of prize money for the tournament is shown below.

Group stage
Winner: £4,000
Runner-up: £2,000
Third place: £1,500
Fourth place: £1,000

Group winners' stage
Winner: £6,000
Runner-up: £2,500
Third place: £2,000
Fourth place: £1,500

Final group
Winner: £20,000
Runner-up: £8,000
Third place: £4,000
Fourth place: £2,000

Tournament total: £218,000

Tournament summary

Group stages

The first round of group games were played from 1 to 8 June. Reigning world champion Judd Trump won all three group games to qualify from group 2, losing a frame to both Elliot Slessor and Daniel Wells. David Gilbert drew his second match against Jak Jones, but won against Stuart Carrington 3–0 to progress, with Carrington scoring only five points. Belgian player Luca Brecel and Englishman Jack Lisowski both defeated Oliver Lines and drew against Robbie Williams. Brecel made a break of 138 during his win over Lines and took a 2–1 lead over Lisowski. He required a break higher than 138, but was unable, tying the match at 2-2, with Brecel progressing. In group 3, Mark Joyce won all three matches leading Mark Davis. Ryan Day and Kyren Wilson met in the final match of group 12, with the victor winning the group. Day won the first two frames, before Wilson won frame 3. With the higher break, a 111, Wilson could progress with a 2–2 draw, however Day made a break of 86 to win.

In group 4, Harvey Chandler drew his first match against Joe Perry, but won his other two matches to lead the group. Liang Wenbo won group 5 with three wins whilst Joe O'Connor finished second, who made the highest break of his career, and of the event a 143 in his draw with Mark Selby. Gary Wilson won group 14, scoring four century breaks in ten frames. Both Ronnie O'Sullivan and Tom Ford won groups on 5 June, with O'Sullivan not losing a single frame. Stuart Bingham and Ricky Walden both finished group 1 with a win and two draws. The final match of the group was between Jamie Clarke and Jordan Brown. Jordan requiring a 3–0 win to progress, but the match was won by Clarke. Ben Woollaston won group 8, but spent the tournament estranged from his wife Tatiana Woollaston, who had been refereeing the event due to the social distancing rules.

Barry Hawkins won group 7, ahead of Anthony McGill with two wins and a draw. Former world champion Neil Robertson lost his opening match to Ashley Carty, who won the group. Martin O'Donnell and Mark Allen both won two matches, before they met in the final match of the round. The match finished 2-2, with O'Donnell winning the group with a better frame difference. Group 6 was won by Sam Craigie, who finished above Masters finalist Ali Carter.

Winner's and final groups
The 16 groups winners were split into four groups, labelled A through D and played on 9 and 10 June. Three players finished on six points in group C. Ronnie O'Sullivan won a fourth straight match without losing a frame, before winning 3–1 against Sam Craigie, who defeated Stuart Bingham in his first match, and defeated Harvey Chandler in the final match. The match between O'Sullivan and Bingham would decide the winner of the group, but Bingham won 3–0 to lead the other players on frame difference.

Martin O'Donnell defeated Sam Woollaston 3–1, before Woollaston won his next two matches 3–0, with three century breaks over Tom Ford to win the group on frame difference. Luca Brecel won group A after defeating Ashley Carty, and drawing his other two games 2-2. Ryan Day defeated reigning world champion Judd Trump in the opening match of group B, which he went on to win with two other draws. In the final match, against Barry Hawkins, Day needed to win one frame to go through to the final group, and won frame one with a break of 62.

The final group was played on 11 June. The opening match was between Brecel and Bingham, with Brecel winning all three frames. Woollaston then defeated Ryan Day 3–1, before Day drew his remaining two matches to finish the group fourth on two points. Stuart Bingham defeated Woollaston 3-1 finishing third with four points. The final match was between Brecel and Woollaston. Woolaston could win the tournament with a win, or Brecel would win the championship. In the third frame, Woollaston took a 2–1 lead, with a century break of 126, so whoever won the final frame would win the event. In the deciding frame, Brecel made a break of 111 to draw the match, and win the tournament, ahead of Woollaston, who finished as runner-up.

Main draw

Group stage
The group stage consisted of 16 groups, each containing four players. Two groups played to a finish each day from 1 to 8 June.

Group 1
Group 1 was played on 6 June.

Group 2
Group 2 was played on 1 June.

Group 3
Group 3 was played on 2 June.

Group 4
Group 4 was played on 3 June.

Group 5
Group 5 was played on 4 June.

Group 6
Group 6 was played on 8 June.

Group 7
Group 7 was played on 7 June.

Group 8
Group 8 was played on 6 June.

Group 9
Group 9 was played on 2 June.

Group 10
Group 10 was played on 5 June.

Group 11
Group 11 was played on 8 June.

Group 12
Group 12 was played on 3 June.

Group 13
Group 13 was played on 1 June.

Group 14
Group 14 was played on 4 June.

Group 15
Group 15 was played on 5 June.

Group 16
Group 16 was played on 7 June.

Group winners' stage
The group winners' stage consisted of four groups, each containing four players. Groups C and D played to a finish on 9 June. Groups A and B played to a finish on 10 June.

Group A

Group B

Group C

Group D

Final group
The tournament finals, consisting of one final group of four players, was played on 11 June. Luca Brecel won the event after finishing top of the final group, with Ben Woollaston the runner-up.

Key:P=Matchesplayed; W=Matcheswon; D=Matchesdrawn; L=Matcheslost; FW=Frameswon; FL=Frameslost; FD=Framedifference; HB=Highestbreak

Century breaks
A total of 53 century breaks were made during the event. The highest was a 143 made by Joe O'Connor in group 5. Scores in bold denote highest break in the indicated group.

143 (5)  Joe O'Connor
141 (FG), 134 (D), 127, 126, 101  Ben Woollaston
138 (9), 111, 109, 106, 105  Luca Brecel
137 (6)  Matthew Selt
136  Oliver Lines
134 (14), 132 (A), 125, 107, 100  Gary Wilson
131, 123  Sam Craigie
130 (B), 114  Barry Hawkins
130 (15)  Tom Ford
128  Martin O'Donnell
122, 107, 105, 103  Ryan Day
121 (3)  Louis Heathcote
120, 117, 100 (13)  David Gilbert
119 (10)  Chris Wakelin
119 (16), 107, 106  Neil Robertson
117, 103, 100  Liang Wenbo
116, 112, 104 (C), 101  Ronnie O'Sullivan
114  Ali Carter
111 (12)  Kyren Wilson
107 (7), 106  Anthony McGill
106 (2)  Elliot Slessor
105 (1)  Jamie Clarke
104   Jack Lisowski
102  Chen Feilong
101 (4)  Harvey Chandler
101  Mark Joyce

References

External links
 Matchroom Sport – Championship League Snooker
 World Snooker – Calendar 2019/2020 

2020
2020 in snooker
2020 in English sport
June 2020 sports events in the United Kingdom
2020 Championship League